Manganese(II) oxide  is an inorganic compound with chemical formula MnO. It forms green crystals.  The compound is produced on a large scale as a component of fertilizers and food additives.

Structure, stoichiometry, reactivity
Like many monoxides, MnO adopts the rock salt structure, where cations and anions are both octahedrally coordinated. Also like many oxides, manganese(II) oxide is often nonstoichiometric: its composition can vary from MnO to MnO1.045.

Below 118 K MnO is antiferromagnetic. MnO has the distinction of being one of the first compounds to have its magnetic structure determined by neutron diffraction, the report appearing in 1951. This study  showed that the Mn2+ ions form a face centered cubic magnetic sub-lattice where there are ferromagnetically coupled sheets that are anti-parallel with adjacent sheets.

Manganese(II) oxide undergoes the chemical reactions typical of an ionic oxide. Upon treatment with acids, it converts to the corresponding manganese(II) salt and water. Oxidation of manganese(II) oxide gives manganese(III) oxide.

Preparation and occurrence
MnO occurs in nature as the rare mineral manganosite.  It is prepared commercially by reduction of MnO2 with hydrogen, carbon monoxide or methane, e.g.:
MnO2  +  H2  →  MnO  +  H2O
MnO2 + CO → MnO + CO2
Upon heating to 450°C, manganese(II) nitrate gives a mixture of oxides, MnO2-x, which can be reduced to the monoxide with hydrogen at ≥750°C.
MnO is particular stable and resists further reduction.
MnO can also be prepared by heating the carbonate:
MnCO3  →   MnO + CO2
This calcining process is conducted anaerobically, lest Mn2O3 form.

An alternative route, mostly for demonstration purposes, is the oxalate method, which also applicable to the synthesis of ferrous oxide and stannous oxide. Upon heating in an oxygen-free atmosphere (usually CO2), manganese(II) oxalate decomposes into MnO:
MnC2O4·2H2O   →   MnO  +  CO2  +  CO  +  2 H2O

Applications
Together with manganese sulfate, MnO is a component of fertilizers and food additives.  Many thousands of tons are consumed annually for this purpose. Other uses include: a catalyst in the manufacture of allyl alcohol, ceramics, paints, colored glass, bleaching tallow and textile printing.

References

Manganese(II) compounds
Transition metal oxides
Rock salt crystal structure